The following highways are numbered 558:

United States

Other places